Michelanne Forster (born 26 April 1953) is a New Zealand playwright and scriptwriter who was born in California, USA. Her writing career began in the 1980s at Television New Zealand where she worked on the popular pre-school program Play School. Her plays have been performed both nationally and internationally and are often based on historical accounts. In 2011 Forster was the writer-in-residence at the Michael King Writer's Centre.

Education
Forster graduated from the University of Auckland with a Bachelor of Arts and also holds a Diploma in Teaching from the Auckland Secondary Teachers College. In 2014 she completed her honours in Drama through the University of Auckland.

Plays
Always My Sister
Don't Mention Casablanca
Tic Tac (with Paul Barrett)
The Great Storm of 1868
My Heart is Bathed in Blood
This Other Eden
The Rosenberg Sisters
Larnach – Castle of Lies
Songs My mother Taught Me (Music by Felicity Williams)
Daughters of Heaven
A Dream Romance (Musical)

Plays for children
Sapai and the Yam Snatchers (with Leilani Unasa)
The Butcher and The Bear of kirstyn
The Secret of Dongting Lake
In the Deep End
Mean Jean the Pirate Queen
The Bungling Burglars (music by Felicity Williams)
Rodney Rat and the Sneaky WeaselGang
Rivals and Idols
Arabella and the Amazing Wardrobe
Musical Beasts

Awards
 2011 Writer-in-Residence Michael King Writer's Centre, University of Auckland
 1997 Best Radio New Zealand Drama, The Rosenberg Sisters 
 1996 Best Radio New Zealand Drama, Larnach – Castle of Lies 
 1994 Buckland Memorial Award for Literature, Daughters of Heaven 
 1993 Writer-in-Residence University of Canterbury

Publications
Daughters of Heaven (Polish translation) in Dwa Oceany (Agencja Dramatu i Treatru ADiT, 2013)
When Its Over: New Zealanders Talk about Their Experiences of Separation and Divorce (Penguin, 1998) 
The Rosenberg Sisters in Playlunch: Five Short New Zealand Plays (Otago University Press, 1996)
Daughters of Heaven (Otago University Press, 1992)
Rodney Rat and the Space Creatures (Hodder and Stoughton, 1989)
Rodney Rat and the Sneaky Weasel Gang (Hodder and Stoughton, 1985)
The Four-Legged Prince (Hodder and Stoughton, 1985)
Rodney Rat and the Sunken Treasure (Hodder and Stoughton, 1983)

References

1953 births
Living people
20th-century New Zealand dramatists and playwrights
New Zealand women dramatists and playwrights
University of Auckland alumni
20th-century New Zealand women writers
21st-century New Zealand dramatists and playwrights
21st-century New Zealand women writers